Jameson Williams (born March 26, 2001) is an American football wide receiver for the Detroit Lions of the National Football League (NFL). He played college football at Ohio State before transferring to Alabama in 2021, where he was named an All-American. Williams was drafted by the Lions in the first round of the 2022 NFL Draft.

Early life and high school
Williams was born on March 26, 2001, and grew up in St. Louis, Missouri. He attended Cardinal Ritter College Prep High School and played for their football team. As a junior, Williams caught 36 passes for 1,062 yards and 15 touchdowns and returned three kickoffs for touchdowns. He was named an Under Armour All-American after finishing his senior season with 68 receptions for 1,626 yards and 22 touchdowns. Williams also ran track at Cardinal Ritter and won back-to-back Class 3 state titles in the 300 meter hurdles and set the state record. He was rated a four-star football prospect and committed to play at Ohio State.

College career

Ohio State
Williams began his collegiate career at Ohio State. He caught six passes for 112 yards and a touchdown in his freshman season. As a sophomore, Williams started six games and had nine receptions for 154 yards and two touchdowns. In the 2021 Sugar Bowl, Williams scored a touchdown on a 45-yard reception against Clemson in the College Football Playoffs Semifinal. After the season, Williams announced that he would transfer to Alabama.

Alabama

Williams was named a starter for the Crimson Tide going into his first season with the team. He made an instant impact with four receptions for 126 receiving yards and one touchdown in a 44–13 victory over Miami in the Chick-fil-A Kickoff Game. He was named the Southeastern Conference (SEC) Special Teams Player of the Week for Week 4 after returning three kickoffs for 177 yards and two touchdowns and also caught an 81-yard touchdown pass in a 63–14 win over Southern Miss. He had ten receptions for 146 receiving yards and two touchdowns in the 41–38 loss to Texas A&M on October 9. On November 6, he had ten receptions for 160 receiving yards and one touchdown in a 20–14 victory over LSU. One week later, he had six receptions for 158 yards and three touchdowns in a 59–3 victory over New Mexico State. In the following game, against Arkansas, he had eight receptions for 190 receiving yards and three touchdowns in the 42–35 victory. In the SEC Championship, a 41–24 victory over Georgia, he had seven receptions for 184 receiving yards and two touchdowns. Williams was named first-team All-SEC and All-American as well as the conference's co-Special Teams Player of the Year. Williams suffered a torn ACL in the 2022 College Football Playoff National Championship rematch with Georgia. He finished the 2021 season with 79 receptions for 1,572 yards and 15 touchdowns. He led the SEC in receiving yards, yards per reception, and receiving touchdowns. He declared for the 2022 NFL Draft following the championship game and began to rehab from the injury.

Professional career

Williams was selected by the Detroit Lions in the first round (12th overall) of the 2022 NFL Draft. The pick was acquired with a second round pick (used for Josh Paschal) via a trade with the Minnesota Vikings for Detroit's first, second, and third round picks. He was placed on the reserve/non-football injury list to start the season on August 23, 2022, due to the torn ACL suffered in college.

Williams returned to practice on November 21, 2022, and was activated on December 3, prior to Week 13. He made his debut against the Jacksonville Jaguars, logging zero catches on one target in the Lions 40–14 victory. The next week, his first career reception was a 41-yard receiving touchdown, contributing to a 34–23 victory over the same Minnesota Vikings team who traded his pick away. In Week 17, he had a 40-yard rush in a 41–10 victory over the Chicago Bears.

References

External links

 Detroit Lions bio
 Alabama Crimson Tide bio
 Ohio State Buckeyes bio

2001 births
Living people
American football wide receivers
Alabama Crimson Tide football players
Detroit Lions players
Ohio State Buckeyes football players
All-American college football players
Players of American football from St. Louis